Bobby Levy is an American politician serving as a Republican member of the Oregon House of Representatives.

On December 11, 2020, Levy and 11 other state Republican officials signed a letter requesting Oregon Attorney General Ellen Rosenblum join Texas and other states contesting the results of the 2020 presidential election in Texas v. Pennsylvania. Rosenblum announced she had filed in behalf of the defense, and against Texas, the day prior.

References 

Living people
Republican Party members of the Oregon House of Representatives
21st-century American women politicians
Year of birth missing (living people)
21st-century American politicians